The women's 100m T42 event at the 2008 Summer Paralympics took place at the Beijing National Stadium on 13 September. There were no heats in this event.

Final

Competed at 18:15.

WR = World Record.

References
 
 

W
2008 in women's athletics